Erick Brendon Pinheiro da Silva (born 23 May 1995), commonly known as Erick Brendon, is a Brazilian professional footballer who plays as a midfielder for Värnamo.

Career statistics

Club

Notes

References

1995 births
Living people
Sportspeople from Niterói
Sportspeople from Rio de Janeiro (state)
Brazilian footballers
Association football midfielders
Ettan Fotboll players
Superettan players
Botafogo de Futebol e Regatas players
America Football Club (Rio de Janeiro) players
Associação Atlética Portuguesa (RJ) players
Central Sport Club players
Goytacaz Futebol Clube players
IFK Värnamo players
Brazilian expatriate footballers
Brazilian expatriate sportspeople in Sweden
Expatriate footballers in Sweden